Hypoprasis elegans is a species of beetle in the family Buprestidae, the only species in the genus Hypoprasis.

References

Monotypic Buprestidae genera
Buprestidae